Susaek Station is a station on the Gyeongui-Jungang Line. It is also the former name of Digital Media City Station on Line 6 of the Seoul Subway. Mugunghwa-ho and Saemaeul-ho trains that operate up to Seoul or Yongsan Stations are serviced at the Susaek Train Depot behind this station.

External links
 Station information from Korail

Railway stations opened in 1908
Seoul Metropolitan Subway stations
Metro stations in Eunpyeong District
1908 establishments in Korea